The Prince of Wales Skating Rink, more commonly known as the Prince's Rink, was a domed wooden ice arena located on Factory Lane in St. John's, Newfoundland and Labrador, Canada, that operated for over 42 years. It was named in honour of Edward, the Prince of Wales and the eldest son of Queen Victoria. The historic Prince's Rink hosted the first thirty-eight St. John's senior hockey league championships (Boyle Trophy) and the first seven all-Newfoundland hockey championships (Herder Memorial Trophy) before the building was destroyed by fire on November 28, 1941.

Construction
On December 11, 1898 the foundation for the rink was laid near the old Newfoundland Railway terminus at Fort William on the west side of Factory Lane between Plymouth Road and Forest Road (sandwich between curling rink and Queen's College). The land was previously owned by the Reid Newfoundland Railway. Robert G. Reid Sr. deeded the land in exchange for shares of equal value in the new rink management company. The Rink followed the size and design of the Montagnard Rink built in 1898 at Montreal. Two Reid Railway engineers, Fred Angel and W.H. Murray, drew up the plans for the new rink. The wooden structure was built by Campbell and Company and Horwood Lumber Company and was completed in less than two months. Planks recovered from a ship wreck were steamed, curved and bolted to form the dome roof.

Opening
The rink opened on Saturday January 28, 1899 with 200 and

First Hockey Game
The first hockey match played on the new rink's ice surface was a game arranged by the newly founded city hockey league between native Canadians and native Newfoundlanders on February 1, 1899.

Ownership
In the summer of 1933 the owners stated that the 30-year-old rink would not open the following winter and subsequently put the rink up for sale. The Guards Athletic Association of St. John's purchased the rink and hired Arthur Johnson as manager.

In 1937 a new company, the Arena Rink Company Limited, was formed and took ownership of the rink and retained Arthur Johnson as manager. The major shareholders were two influential St. John's Businessmen, Chesley Crosbie and Chesley A. Pippy. They changed the name of the rink to 'the Arena'.

Newfoundland's First Artificial Ice
The Arena Rink Company installed an ice-making plant shortly after taking ownership to lengthen the hockey and skating season. In August 1937 Newfoundland's first artificial ice surface was tested.

Rink Managers
Over the 42 years of operation there were five rink managers: James P. Fox (1899), Frank Donnelly, Charles Bulley, P. E. 'Neddy' Outerbridge, Arthur Johnson (1933-1941)

November 1941 Fire
On Friday November 28, 1941 the Arena was catering to a private skating party that included military personnel. At 7:20 pm fire broke out in the boiler room and very quickly the wooden structure was completely engulfed in flames. A spectacular blaze lit the city on a night with a mandatory wartime blackout. The primary ice arena in St. John's and the adjacent curling rink burned to the ground.

Site Today

The site of the former rink is now an office tower at 10 Fort William Place.

References

External links
 - Map of Fort William Area where rink was located
 - Photograph of rink located to the right of the Hotel Newfoundland

Former ice hockey venues in Newfoundland and Labrador
Sports venues in St. John's, Newfoundland and Labrador
Defunct indoor ice hockey venues in Canada
Defunct indoor arenas in Canada
Sports venues completed in 1899
1899 establishments in Newfoundland
1941 disestablishments in Newfoundland
Sports venues demolished in 1941